The Bernese State Railway (Bernische Staatsbahn, BSB) was a railway company in Switzerland. The BSB was owned by the Canton of Bern and was the first government-owned railway in Switzerland.

History

The BSB was established in 1861 from the bankrupt estate of the Swiss East–West Railway (Schweizerische Ostwestbahn, OWB), which began the construction of the La Neuveville–Biel/Bienne–Bern–Gümligen–Langnau–Lucerne–Zug–Zürich line despite a lack of funds. Taking into account the subsidies of Swiss francs (CHF) 2 million that had already been transferred to it, the canton of Bern decided to take over the unfinished part of the line within Bern for CHF 7 million.
 
The rail network of the BSB initially consisted only of the La Neuveville–Biel/Bienne line that was opened by the OWB, which was leased to the Swiss Central Railway (Schweizerische Centralbahn, SCB) in 1864. Until then, the BSB did not have its own rolling stock. The Biel–Zollikofen (–Bern) and (Bern–) Gümligen–Langnau lines were put into operation on 1 June 1864. In order for the BSB to establish its own business, it procured 12 locomotives, 39 passenger cars and 130 freight wagons in 1864.
 
In 1875, the newly opened Bern-Lucerne Railway (Bern-Luzern-Bahn, BLB) acquired the Gümligen–Langnau branch line for CHF 7.34 million. It was hoped that the establishment of a continuous link to Lucerne would improve the profitability of the line. Due to excessive construction costs, however, the BLB became bankrupt in 1876 and was bought at auction by the canton of Bern for CHF 8.5 million in 1877. At the same time, the BSB was dissolved and the Zollikofen–Biel–La Neuveville section was sold to the Bernese Jura Railway (Chemins de fer du Jura bernois, JB) for shares worth CHF 11.56 million.
 
Financially, the BSB was quite successful. More than CFF 6.2 million flowed as profits to the state treasury from 1864 to 1877.

Rolling stock 
The following is a list of locomotives used at the BSB:

References

Footnotes

Sources
 
 
 
 

Defunct railway companies of Switzerland
1861 establishments in Switzerland
1877 disestablishments in Switzerland
Transport in the canton of Bern
Swiss companies established in 1861
Railway companies established in 1861
Railway companies disestablished in 1877